Nothing but the Truth may refer to:

A part of an oath before a sworn testimony is given.

Books
Nothing But the Truth (Isham novel), a 1914 novel by Frederic S. Isham
Nothing But the Truth (Rhode novel), a 1947 novel by John Rhode
 Nothing but the Truth: A Documentary Novel, a 1991 book written by Avi
 Nothing but the Truth, a 1971 autobiography by Joseph Berger-Barzilai
 Nothing but the Truth, a 1999 legal crime thriller by John Lescroart

Film and TV
 Nothing But the Truth (1920 film), an American silent film directed by 	David Kirkland
 Nothing but the Truth (1929 film), an American comedy film directed by 	Victor Schertzinger
 Nothing But the Truth (1939 film), a Swedish comedy film directed by Weyler Hildebrand
 Nothing but the Truth (1941 film), an American comedy film directed by 	Elliott Nugent
 Nothing but the Truth (2008 American film), a drama
 Nothing but the Truth (2008 South African film)
 Nothing but the Truth (British game show), hosted by Jerry Springer
 Nada más que la verdad, a Spanish-language game show, also called Nothing but the Truth
 "Nothing but the Truth" (seaQuest DSV), the fifteenth episode of seaQuest DSV`s first season

Music
 Nothing but the Truth (Mac McAnally album), 1983
 Nothing But the Truth (Rubén Blades album), 1988, by Rubén Blades featuring Sting, Elvis Costello, and Lou Reed
 Nothing but the Truth (Son Seals album), 1994
 Nothing but the Truth (Southern Sons album), 1991
 "Nothing but the Truth", on the album Exotic Birds and Fruit by Procol Harum